Captain Herbert James Moss (1883–1956) was a Scottish Unionist Party politician.  He was the Member of Parliament (MP) for Rutherglen from 1931 to 1935.

References

External links 
 

1883 births
1956 deaths
Members of the Parliament of the United Kingdom for Scottish constituencies
UK MPs 1931–1935
Unionist Party (Scotland) MPs